Kis Din Mera Viyah Howay Ga (Season 4) is a Pakistani comedy series that aired on Geo Entertainment which is the fourth season of Kis Din Mera Viyah Howay Ga as Ramadan special sitcom. Previously the series has premiered its season 1, 2 and 3 in 2011, 2012, and 2013 respectively. Every year new female leads are introduced whereas the main characters of Nazaakat (Aijaz Aslam) and Sheedo (Faysal Qureshi) remain the same.

The serial premiered it 4th season after a gap of five years on 17 May 2018. Comedy serial re-run on the channel from 25 August 2018 followed by Tohmat and aired weekly.

This season marks the first appearance of Ghana Ali, internet sensation Shafaat Ali, Fakhr-e-Alam and Yashma Gill in this comedy series franchise. This season is produced by Aijaz Aslam's own production house, Ice Media and Entertainment. Aijaz Alsam also reprises a double role in the sitcom as antagonist Don Bhai and Salman Khan die-hard fan Chaudhary Nazakat.

Plot
Don, totally homomorphic and alike person of Nazakat, is here on Earth. Can Nazakat have a wedding in this season, or will Don have a day?

Cast and characters

Season overview

Broadcasting Overview

See also 
List of programs broadcast by Geo TV
Geo Entertainment
Suno Chanda

References

External links
 

Ramadan special television shows
Pakistani comedy television series
2018 Pakistani television series debuts